The Lakeside Park Carousel is a historic carousel located in Port Dalhousie, Ontario, Canada, a community in the city of St. Catharines.

History
The Lakeside Park Carousel was carved by Charles I.D. Looff between 1898 and 1905 in Brooklyn, New York. The animals were carved by Looff's factory workers, including Marcus Illions, who worked for Looff at the time. The carousel's rounding boards and scenery panels were built by George William Kremer, and are similar in appearance to those found on the Knoebels Grand Carousel, which is the only other Kremer carousel still in operation. In 1921, the carousel was moved from its original location in Scarborough, Ontario to its current location in Port Dalhousie. At the time, Lakeside Park had 58 attractions. The Lakeside Park Carousel is the only remaining attraction at Lakeside Park, and is now owned by the city of St. Catharines.

Description

The carousel has 68 hand-carved wooden animals, including horses, lions, camels, goats and giraffes. The carousel also has four chariots. The animals on the carousel still have real horsehair tails.

Friends of the Lakeside Park Carousel
The Friends of the Lakeside Park Carousel are a group of dedicated volunteers who have carefully and fully restored the carousel, and continue to care for and maintain the carousel to keep it in perfect working order.

Frati & Co. Band Organ

The Lakeside Park Carousel is home to a late 19th century band organ built by Frati & Co. of Berlin, and is located in the centre of the carousel. The organ was originally played by a pinned barrel, but was converted by Wurlitzer at some point between 1927 and the 1940s to their Wurlitzer 150 scale. The organ is equipped with automatic stops, percussion instruments (also known as "traps") and a duplex roll-frame, which allows for continuous music. When one roll is finished playing, the next one starts playing while the first one rewinds to begin again. Employees from the municipal government change the music rolls every two days.

On very hot and humid days, carousel employees usually opt to play recorded carousel music, due to the fact that the high temperature and humidity de-tune the organ. 

The band organ was restored in 1985, and again in 2005, and is continuously maintained by the city of St. Catharines.

References

Carousels
Tourist attractions in Ontario
Buildings and structures in St. Catharines